

List of Ambassadors

 Feredi Eitan 1998 - 2001
 Ariel Kerem 2002 - 2003
 Boaz Bismut 2004 - 2008

Michael Arbel 2008 - 2009

See also 

 Israel–Mauritania relations

References

Mauritania
Israel